Ishak bin Muhamad is a Malaysian politician who served as Speaker of the Pahang State Legislative Assembly from May 2013 to December 2022, Member of the Pahang State Executive Council (EXCO) from December 1999 and Member of the Pahang State Legislative Assembly (MLA) for Bebar from April 1995 to May 2013. He is a member of the United Malays National Organisation (UMNO), a component party of the Barisan Nasional (BN) coalition.

Election Results

Honours
  :
  Knight Companion of the Order of the Crown of Pahang (DIMP) – Dato' (2000)
  Knight Companion of the Order of Sultan Ahmad Shah of Pahang (DSAP) – Dato' (2007)
 Grand Knight of the Order of the Crown of Pahang (SIMP) – Dato' Indera (2012)
  Grand Knight of the Order of Sultan Ahmad Shah of Pahang (SSAP) – Dato' Sri (2014)

References

United Malays National Organisation politicians
Members of the Pahang State Legislative Assembly
Pahang state executive councillors
21st-century Malaysian politicians
Speakers of the Pahang State Legislative Assembly
Living people
Year of birth missing (living people)

People from Pahang
Malaysian people of Malay descent
Malaysian Muslims